The Adventures of Raggedy Ann and Andy is an American animated television series that aired on CBS from September 17 to December 24, 1988. Based on the dolls Raggedy Ann and Andy by Johnny Gruelle, the series was produced directly by CBS in honor of the 70th anniversary of the characters. The series was cancelled in 1989, although CBS aired reruns during the 1989–90 television season, and in August 1991 when Pee-Wee's Playhouse was shelved.

Overview
The plot involved a little girl named Marcella whose Raggedy Ann and Andy dolls would come to life when no humans were present in her bedroom. Then they would be whisked off to a parallel world to save its inhabitants from the villain, an evil but inept sorcerer known as Cracklin.

Also aiding Ann and Andy, besides the Camel with the Wrinkled Knees, were two of Marcella's other stuffed animals, a panda with a faux-British accent known as Grouchy Bear and a stuffed rabbit known as Sunny Bunny, as well as the Raggedy Cat and the Raggedy Dog. Sometimes they would be joined by more modern toys such as robots or toy soldiers. Often the plot involved the toys helping children in such places as Ancient Egypt or a Native American tribe. As the cartoon was meant for younger audiences it was unlike most other cartoons of the 1980s which had "morals to the story" at the end, although one episode lightly touched upon the issue of poaching when Raggedy Ann, Andy and their friends had to save endangered unicorns from cattle rustlers, who sought to steal their horns for personal gain.

Voice cast

Main voices
Christina Lange as Raggedy Ann
Josh Rodine as Raggedy Andy
Charlie Adler as Grouchy Bear, Tick & Tack 
Kenneth Mars as The Camel with the Wrinkled Knees
Katie Leigh as Sunny Bunny
Dana Hill as Raggedy Dog
Kath Soucie as Raggedy Cat
Gaille Heidemann as Mother
Tracy Rowe as Marcella

Additional voices
Michael Bell - Cracklin
Bob Bergen
Sheryl Bernstein - Helena
P.L. Brown
Ruth Buzzi
William Callaway
Hamilton Camp
Nancy Cartwright - Little Chicken
Chris Cavanaugh - Cody
Cam Clarke
Danny Cooksey - Cousin David
Brian Cummings
Jim Cummings - Trollit
Jennifer Darling - Clea, Nephra
Ellen Gerstell - Princess Astra
Tony Jay - Ludlam
Sherry Lynn - Lorelei
Dave Mallow
Danny Mann
Allan Melvin
Patty Parris
Rob Paulsen - Tally Ho
David Prince
Hal Rayle
Peter Reneday
Neil Ross
Maggie Roswell
Frank Welker - Megamite

Episodes
Thirteen episodes were created:

References

External links

1988 American television series debuts
1988 American television series endings
1980s American animated television series
American children's animated adventure television series
American children's animated fantasy television series
Sentient toys in fiction
CBS original programming
English-language television shows
American television shows based on children's books
Television series by CBS Studios
Raggedy Ann